Dugdugi is  a 2011 Pakistani comedy sitcom which aired Sundays on ARY Digital. The term is an Urdu word which refers to a musical instrument.  The show follows Azfar, the jobless person being wrongly insulted by his in-laws and stars Azfar Rehman, Durdana Butt, Shagufta Ejaz, Ashraf Khan and Nausheen Shah. The show's concept and production is given by Nabeel.

Cast 
 Azfar Rehman as Azfar Rehman "Mr faraydiya" (2011-2013)
 Agha Shiraz as Agha Shearaz Mr Faraydiya" (2013-2015)
 Durdana Butt as Durdana Butt "Ashraf mother"
 Shagufta Ejaz as Sagufta
 Ashraf Khan as Ashraf
 Nausheen Shah as Nousheen Durdana's daughter

References

External links 

ARY Digital original programming
Urdu-language television shows
Pakistani television sitcoms
2011 Pakistani television series debuts